Roman Mykhaylovych Pokora (22 February 1948 – 8 March 2021) was a Ukrainian football player and manager who played most of his career as a midfielder.

Career
Born in Zboriv, Pokora lived in Vynnyky, a suburb of Lviv, since the age of 4.

Pokora played four seasons in the Soviet Top League for FC Karpaty Lviv.

Pokora was married and had two sons.

Honours
Karpaty Lviv
 Soviet Cup: 1969

References

External links
 Verbytsky, I. Roman Pokora: Habovda drifted away, and we got scared that his death will be on our conscience (Роман Покора: Габовда поплыл, а мы испугались, что его смерть будет на нашей совести). UA-Football. 18 January 2017.

1948 births
2021 deaths
People from Zboriv
Soviet footballers
Ukrainian footballers
Association football midfielders
FC Karpaty Lviv players
FC Metalist Kharkiv players
FC Spartak Ivano-Frankivsk players
Soviet Top League players
Ukrainian football managers
Soviet football managers
CSF Bălți managers
Ukrainian Premier League managers
NK Veres Rivne managers
FC Volyn Lutsk managers
FC Polissya Zhytomyr managers
FC Oleksandriya managers
FC Nyva Vinnytsia managers
MFC Mykolaiv managers
FC Helios Kharkiv managers
FC Enerhetyk Burshtyn managers
FC Skala Stryi (1911) managers
FC Halychyna Drohobych managers
Ukrainian expatriate football managers
Expatriate football managers in Azerbaijan
Expatriate football managers in Georgia (country)
Sportspeople from Ternopil Oblast